Douglas James "D. J." Kennington (born July 15, 1977) is a Canadian professional stock car racing driver. He currently competes full-time in the NASCAR Pinty's Series, driving the No. 17 Dodge Challenger for his own team DJK Racing. He won the 2010 and 2012 Pinty's Series championships. Kennington also  previously competed part-time in the NASCAR Xfinity Series, driving the No. 99 Toyota Supra for B. J. McLeod Motorsports, and part-time in the Monster Energy NASCAR Cup Series, driving the No. 77 Chevrolet Camaro ZL1 for Spire Motorsports. He is the son of Doug Kennington, a CASCAR driver and founder of St. Thomas Raceway Park.

Racing career

Monster Energy Cup Series

Kennington made his Sprint Cup Series debut at the 2016 Can-Am 500 at Phoenix in the No. 55 for Premium Motorsports, where he finished 35th. In 2017, he joined newly-formed Gaunt Brothers Racing to run the Daytona 500 in the No. 96 Toyota Camry. He qualified in 28th after racing his way in during the second Can-Am Duel qualifying race, but got collected in a 16-car crash on lap 129. He attempted to qualify again for the team at Talladega, but failed to do so. He ran the No. 15 Premium Motorsports at Daytona in July.

In 2018, Kennington returned to Gaunt Brothers Racing, with the team attempting a part-time schedule in the No. 96. At Bristol, Kennington, who is Canadian, ran a paint scheme in memoriam following the Humboldt Broncos bus crash. He finished 27th in the tribute car, with the hood being auctioned for charity. For the FireKeepers Casino 400 at Michigan, Kennington drove the No. 7 for Premium Motorsports.

For the 2019 STP 500, Kennington joined Spire Motorsports' No. 77 Chevrolet.

Xfinity Series
In 2007–2009 he ran the Nationwide Series part-time for MacDonald Motorsports in a Dodge Charger. He has over 30 starts but has never cracked the Top 10. His career best NASCAR Nationwide Series finish was an 11th-place finish driving for Rensi-Hamilton in the Del Monte Ford in the 2010 race in Montreal. Kennington has also raced for Jennifer Jo Cobb Racing in the NASCAR Nationwide Series in 2011 Montreal event.

Gander Outdoors Truck Series
In 2010, he ran some races with Rick Ware Racing and finished seventeenth in his first Camping World Truck Series start at Martinsville Speedway.

In 2013, Kennington returned to the Camping World Truck Series at Phoenix International Raceway, driving the No. 1 Chevrolet Silverado for Rick Ware Racing; he finished last after an early accident. Three years later, Kennington ran two Truck races for Premium Motorsports at Canadian Tire Motorsports Park and Martinsville Speedway, finishing 14th and 23rd, respectively. In 2017, he and Gaunt Brothers Racing contested the Truck race at Mosport in the No. 96 Toyota Tundra. He rejoined Premium Motorsports' No. 15 truck at Talladega where he finished 15th.

In August 2019, Kennington replaced a suspended Tyler Dippel in the No. 02 Young's Motorsports truck at Mosport.

Pinty's Series
In 2007 he drove the No. 17 Castrol sponsored car in the NASCAR Canadian Tire Series. He won both the Barrie Speedway races and a pole, ending up second in the points. Kennington struggled in the 2008 season with no wins. In 2009, he won at Delaware Speedway from pole and had a solid season including the pole at Riverside International Speedway and won the season finale at Kawartha Speedway, lead to him finishing second in points. He started off the 2010 season by defending his win at Delaware and picking up the pole for that event. Kennington won the third race of the year after leading only the last lap passing both Kerry Micks and Scott Steckly en route to victory at Autodrome Saint-Eustache. At Motoplex Speedway he started on the pole and lead the majority of the race but lost to Scott Steckly in the last few laps. Kennington picked up his third win from the pole at Saskatoon but after problems in Montreal Kennington fell back in the points. He won at Barrie Speedway and Riverside Speedway, retaking the points lead. A pole and a third-place finish at the final race at Kawartha Speedway would clinch his first ever NASCAR Championship and a spot in the Toyota Showdown. He would finish second to Jason Bowles, the highest finish for anyone from the Canadian Tire Series. During the 2011 season Kennington won the events at Kawartha and Auto Clearing Speedway to finish Second in the Points standings. In the 2012 Canadian Tire season Kennington went to win a NASCAR touring record of 5 consecutive races at Canadian Tire Motorsport Park, Delaware Speedway, Motoplex Speedway, Edmonton Indy and Auto Clearing Motor Speedway; he won seven total races during the season on his way to the 2012 series championship. At Jukasa Motor Speedway at the end of September 2018, Kennington claimed his first career win since 2013.

CASCAR
Kennington made his debut in 1998 season, driving the No. 17 Castrol sponsored car for his own team. He ran full-time in CASCAR Super Series from 1998 season until 2006 season when NASCAR purchased CASCAR and created the NASCAR Canadian Tire Series in 2007 season. Kennington had 7 wins, 38 Top 5, 60 Top 10 and 7 pole-positions in 83 races. Kennington best championship result was runner-up in 2002 season.

Hooters Procup Series
In 2004 and 2005 he ran a partial schedule in the USAR Hooters Procup Series as an owner/driver for DJK Racing.

Motorsports career results

NASCAR
(key) (Bold – Pole position awarded by qualifying time. Italics – Pole position earned by points standings or practice time. * – Most laps led.)

Monster Energy Cup Series

Daytona 500

Xfinity Series

Gander Outdoors Truck Series

Busch North Series

K&N Pro Series West

Whelen Modified Tour

Pinty's Series

 Season still in progress
 Ineligible for series points

Gallery

References

External links

 
 

Living people
1977 births
People from St. Thomas, Ontario
Racing drivers from Ontario
NASCAR drivers
CARS Tour drivers